Ivan Denisovich, also in English territories titled as 100 Minutes is a 2021 Russian historical war drama film directed by Gleb Panfilov, a film adaptation based on the story by Aleksandr Solzhenitsyn's One Day in the Life of Ivan Denisovich. The film premiered at the 2021 Locarno International Film Festival. It was theatrically released on September 23, 2021 by Central Partnership.

Plot 
Soldier Ivan Denisovich Shukhov was taken prisoner by the Germans, and after leaving it, he ended up in his homeland as a prisoner and he began to build a giant space industry plant. In conditions of hunger, humiliation and fear, he managed to maintain honesty and openness to the world, but will he be able to go free and meet with his daughters?

Cast

Reception
The film went on the shortlist for the Golden Eagle Award, along with such works as Persian Lessons and Silver Skates in the Best Film category.

Anton Dolin of Meduza praised the film, saying "Panfilov's film is a whole iconostasis of images, which one would like to carefully examine and which is not easily forgotten."

References

External links 
 
 Страница фильма на сайте студии «Централ Партнершип»

2021 films
2020s historical drama films
2021 war drama films
2020s Russian-language films
Russian historical drama films
Russian war drama films
World War II prisoner of war films
Russian World War II films
Films directed by Gleb Panfilov
Films based on works by Aleksandr Solzhenitsyn
Cultural depictions of Joseph Stalin
Films based on Russian novels
Prisoner of war films
Works about the Gulag